Provincial Highway 68 is an expressway, which begins in Hsinchu City at Nanliao on the Provincial Highway No. 15 and ends in Zhudong on Zhongfeng Road (Provincial Road No. 3).

Route Description
Provincial Highway 68 begins at the Nanliao Harbor in the North District and passes through the northern parts of Hsinchu City while running in a south-easterly direction. It then passes through Qionglin, where a bridge can be used to reach Freeway 3. The route eventually ends at an intersection with Provincial Highway 3 in Zhudong.

Length
The total length is 22.992 km (14.287 mi).

Exit list
{| class="plainrowheaders wikitable"
|-
!scope=col|City
!scope=col|Location
!scope=col|km
!scope=col|Mile
!scope=col|Exit
!scope=col|Name
!scope=col|Destinations
!scope=col|Notes
|-

Major Cities Along the Route
Hsinchu City
Zhubei City

Intersections with other Freeways and Expressways
No direct connections. However, Zhubei IC. of National Highway No. 1 and Zhulin IC. of National Highway No. 3 are not far away from this expressway.

Branch lines
The branch line (No. 68A) connects Zhaoyang Road (County Highway No. 123) in Zhudong, Hsinchu.

See also
 Highway system in Taiwan

Notes
The first section (Hsinchu Science Park IC. - Qionglin IC.) completed in 1999.

A trial program to allow a motorcycle with a cylinder capacity of more than 250 cm3 or with an electric power of more than 40 horsepowers was started in January 2005 for one year. This trial program was extended for one year.

References

http://www.thb.gov.tw/

Highways in Taiwan